The Rt Rev Michael Edward Coleman, was an Anglican bishop in the second quarter of the 20th century.

Born in April 1902  and educated at Bradfield College, he was ordained in 1928. After a curacy at Hucknall Torkard he was a Toc H Chaplain in Manchester and western Canada before joining the staff of All Hallows-by-the-Tower. In 1943 he became a Canon at Christ Church Cathedral, Victoria. Seven years later he was appointed  Bishop of Qu'Appelle, a post he held for a decade.

He died on 2 February 1969.

Notes

1902 births
1969 deaths
People educated at Bradfield College
Anglican bishops of Qu'Appelle
20th-century Anglican Church of Canada bishops